German submarine U-1015 was a Type VIIC/41 U-boat of Nazi Germany's Kriegsmarine during World War II.

She was ordered on 23 March 1942, and was laid down on 5 April 1943, at Blohm & Voss, Hamburg, as yard number 215. She was launched on 7 February 1944, and commissioned under the command of Oberleutnant zur See Hans-Heinz Boos on 23 March 1944.

Design
German Type VIIC/41 submarines were preceded by the heavier Type VIIC submarines. U-1015 had a displacement of  when at the surface and  while submerged. She had two shafts and two  propellers.

U-1015 was fitted with five  torpedo tubes (four fitted at the bow and one at the stern), fourteen torpedoes or 26 TMA or TMB Naval mines, one  SK C/35 naval gun, (220 rounds), one  Flak M42 and two  C/30 anti-aircraft guns. The boat had a complement of between forty-four and fifty-two.

Service history
Only 14 survived, including her commander, Oberleutnant zur See Hans-Heinz Boos, out of a crew of 50.

See also
 Battle of the Atlantic

References

Bibliography

German Type VIIC/41 submarines
U-boats commissioned in 1944
World War II submarines of Germany
1944 ships
Ships built in Hamburg
Maritime incidents in May 1944
World War II shipwrecks in the Baltic Sea
U-boats sunk by German submarines
Submarines sunk in collisions